This is a graphical lifespan timeline of prime ministers of Canada. Twenty-three people have served as Prime Minister of Canada since the office came into existence in 1867. They are listed in order of office. (Prime ministers leading multiple ministries are listed in the order of their first premiership).

<div style="overflow:auto">

Sources
Government of Canada. Library of Parliament. "Prime Ministers of Canada". Retrieved September 3, 2016.

Lists of prime ministers of Canada
Prime Ministers of Canada
Graphical timelines
Canadian timelines